Jovan Petrović (1768–16 August 1813), known as Jovan Kursula (Јован Курсула), was a Serbian vojvoda (commander) that participated in the Serbian Revolution.

Biography
Petrović was born in Donja Gorevnica, in the Rudnik okrug, near Čačak, at the time part of the Sanjak of Smederevo (now Serbia). Both his parents, Velimir and Magdalena, had ancestry from Drobnjaci in what is today Montenegro. After his father's death his mother remarried in the village of Cvetke near Kraljevo, bringing Jovan with her.  Kursula had brown hair, light skin, full cheeks, youthful looks, broad shoulders and was slow-witted. He did not carry his sabre from his waist, as did most others, but "over his shoulder, as it was easier to pull out", as he was a master of swordsmanship. He was one of the Rudnik nahija commanders, alongside Lazar Mutap, Arsenije Loma, Milić Drinčić and Milan Obrenović. At the Battle of Varvarin he had a duel against an Ottoman commander known as the "Black Arab" (Crni arapin). He died from wounds from the Battle of Deligrad.

Legacy
A Yugoslav Partisan detachment in Kraljevo named after him was established in 1941. He has several primary schools named after him throughout Serbia, as well as streets in Čačak, Vračar, Niš, Užice, Gornji Milanovac, Zaječar and Zrenjanin.

See also
 List of Serbian Revolutionaries

References

Sources

19th-century Serbian people
Serbian revolutionaries
People of the First Serbian Uprising
Military personnel from Čačak
People from Kraljevo
Swordfighters
1768 births
1813 deaths
Deaths from bleeding
Serbian military leaders
Serbian people of Montenegrin descent